Carl Moritz (27 April 1863 – 23 August 1944) was a German architect and real-estate entrepreneur. Based in Cologne, he built the Cologne opera house of 1902, and various banks, theatres and churches in Germany.

Career 

Born in Berlin, Moritz studied architecture at the Technische Hochschule Charlottenburg. In 1894 he began his career as an independent architect in Berlin; the same year he took a study trip to England, one year later to Italy. From 1896 to 1898 he was inspector at the municipal building department in Cologne, after which he worked there as a freelance architect. He founded eight architectural firms or companies in Cologne in the 1930s, working closely with the architects Albert Betten and Werner Stahl. In 1934 he retired and settled on Lake Starnberg, where he died in Berg, part of Starnberg.

A large part of his work involved bank building; during his career, Moritz designed about 40 banks, mostly for the Barmer Bank Corporation, for whom he worked as a kind of house architect. About 50 houses and 15 housing estates by him are known. Moritz also planned twenty Catholic religious buildings and seven theatres, both construction tasks for which he can be considered a sought-after specialist. He was one of the developers of neo-Gothic architecture in Cologne. He was very interested in the education of future generations, and during his career, held many lectures and wrote several publications.

Works 
Moritz designed theatres, including the opera house in Cologne in 1902, originally named the Stadttheater (Municipal Theatre). It was destroyed in World War II, as was his Stadttheater Düren (1907).

Buildings still in use today include the Opernhaus Wuppertal (1905), the Stralsund Theatre (1913), the Stanisław Wyspianski Theatre, then "Neues Stadttheater" (New Municipal Theatre), in today's Katowice, and a baking factory that now hosts the Hans Peter Zimmer Art Foundation.

Publications 

 "" (Lecture at the convention of the Verband deutscher Architekten und Ingenieur-Vereine (VDAI) in Düsseldorf on 13 September 1904)
In: , 1904
In: , 1904, No. 77
 "" (in Flugblätter für künstlerische Kultur) Stuttgart 1906.
 "" (in the second extra edition of the magazine Die Architektur des XX. Jahrhunderts.) Ernst Wasmuth, Berlin 1909.
 "" (in the seventh extra edition of the magazine  Die Architektur des XX. Jahrhunderts.) Ernst Wasmuth, Berlin 1910.
 "" (in the ninth extra edition of the magazine  .) Ernst Wasmuth, Berlin 1911.

References

Footnotes 

 Ralph Berndt: Bernhard Sehring. dissertation, TU Cottbus, 1998. 
 Klaus Winands:  In: , volume 6 (1999) 
 Wolfram Hagspiel:  Bachem, Köln, 1996. 
 Wulf Herzogenrath:  catalogue, Kölnischer Kunstverein 1984.

External links 

 
 Teatr Slaski im. Stanislawa Wyspianskiego andreas-praefcke.de 
 Wohnhäuser und Villen von Carl Moritz Architekt in Cöln. (Architektur des XX. Jahrhunderts, 2. Sonderheft 1909) klinebooks.com  

1863 births
1944 deaths
20th-century German architects
Real estate and property developers
Architects from Berlin